Kim Tae-gyun (born September 19, 1972), is a South Korean comedian, actor and singer. He is member of comedy duo Cultwo. His syndicated talk radio show Cultwo Show, airs via the SBS Power FM since 2006.

Ambassadorship 
 Public relations ambassador of Seoul Energy Fund (2020–2022)

References

1972 births
Living people
South Korean male singers
South Korean pop singers
South Korean male comedians
South Korean radio presenters
South Korean male musical theatre actors
Seoul Institute of the Arts alumni
Kyung Hee Cyber University alumni